Duosperma is a genus of flowering plants belonging to the family Acanthaceae.

Its native range is Tropical and Southern Africa.

Species:

Duosperma actinotrichum 
Duosperma clarae 
Duosperma crenatum 
Duosperma cuprinum 
Duosperma densiflorum 
Duosperma dichotomum 
Duosperma fanshawei 
Duosperma fimbriatum 
Duosperma glabratum 
Duosperma grandiflorum 
Duosperma kaessneri 
Duosperma kilimandscharicum 
Duosperma latifolium 
Duosperma livingstoniense 
Duosperma longicalyx 
Duosperma nudantherum 
Duosperma parviflorum 
Duosperma porotoense 
Duosperma quadrangulare 
Duosperma rehmannii 
Duosperma sessilifolium 
Duosperma stoloniferum 
Duosperma subquadrangulare 
Duosperma tanzaniense 
Duosperma trachyphyllum 
Duosperma transvaalense

References

Acanthaceae
Acanthaceae genera